Vadakkancheri may refer to

 Vadakkancheri-I, a village in Palakkad district, Kerala, India
 Vadakkancheri-II, a village in Palakkad district, Kerala, India
 Vadakkancheri (gram panchayat), a gram panchayat serving the above villages

See also
 Vadakkencherry, a town in Palakkad district, Kerala
 Wadakkancherry, a town in Thrissur district, Kerala